Amirabad-e Nazarian (also Romanized as Amīrābād-e Naz̧arīān; also known as Amīrābād, and Mīrābād) is a village in Jahadabad Rural District, in the Central District of Anbarabad County, Kerman Province, Iran. At the 2006 census, its population was 1,571, in 364 families.

References 

Populated places in Anbarabad County